Caspar is a unincorporated community in Mendocino County, California, United States. It is bounded on three sides by state parks: the historic 1909 Point Cabrillo Light Station is nearby to the south, Jug Handle State Natural Reserve lies to the north, and its coast forms Caspar Headlands State Beach. The population was 500 at the 2020 census. For statistical purposes, the United States Census Bureau has defined Caspar as a census-designated place (CDP).

History

Caspar was settled in 1857 by Siegfried Caspar, who later sold the land to Jacob Green Jackson, one of the founders of the Caspar Lumber Company, which turned Caspar into a significant logging town in Northern California from 1864 to 1955. Pilings from the mill can be seen on Caspar Beach south of the community. The mill was featured on the cover of a 1938 National Geographic magazine.

Multiple heirs to the Caspar Lumber Company sold their holdings to Georgia-Pacific and a pair of private investors in 1989. The company's principal immediately offered the land for sale. This offer was facilitated by a professor and team of graduate student community planners from the University of California, Berkeley. The process early on committed to consensus and inclusive self-governance, and identified several sacred spaces, principal among them the headlands, once the site of the Caspar Lumber Company's mill, and managed the acquisition of the  headlands parcel in partnership with the Trust for Public Land and the Mendocino Land Trust, which acquired the adjoining beach in 1999. Funded by a California State Coastal Conservancy grant in May 2000, as well as state and federal funds, the headlands were transferred to California State Parks and designated as Caspar Headlands State Reserve in June 2002.

The Caspar Schoolhouse, built in the late 1800s during Caspar's heyday, and expanded during the boom years after 1906, served as a Headstart school and a mail-order company office, then remained empty until it was sold by the Cattle Company to Caspar Community, Inc., the nonprofit entity that organized the community's campaign to preserve its sacred spaces. CCI continues to attempt to acquire the remainder of the property in accordance with the vision of the community since its formation. As of July 2013, the majority of the land is still for sale.

The Caspar post office opened in 1874 and closed on November 15, 1986, when postmaster Georgia Johnson retired.

As of 2013, Caspar has a community center, church and a thriving nightclub. The Caspar Inn existed continuously as a roadhouse from its founding during the heyday of the logging era in 1906 until its closure in February 2013.

Geography
Caspar is along the western edge of Mendocino County and is traversed by California State Route 1, which leads north  to Fort Bragg and south  to Mendocino. Caspar Creek crosses the southern part of the community, entering the Pacific Ocean at Caspar Anchorage, a small cove which is bordered by Caspar State Beach.

The census bureau definition of the area as a CDP may not precisely correspond to local understanding of the area with the same name.

Demographics

2010
The 2010 United States Census reported that Caspar had a population of 509. The racial makeup of Caspar was 474 (93.1%) White, 3 (0.6%) African American, 0 (0.0%) Native American, 8 (1.6%) Asian, 0 (0.0%) Pacific Islander, 3 (0.6%) from other races, and 21 (4.1%) from two or more races. Hispanic or Latino of any race were 15 persons (2.9%).

The Census reported that 507 people (99.6% of the population) lived in households, 2 (0.4%) lived in non-institutionalized group quarters, and 0 (0%) were institutionalized.

There were 252 households, out of which 33 (13.1%) had children under the age of 18 living in them, 109 (43.3%) were opposite-sex married couples living together, 15 (6.0%) had a female householder with no husband present, 7 (2.8%) had a male householder with no wife present.  There were 28 (11.1%) unmarried opposite-sex partnerships, and 5 (2.0%) same-sex married couples or partnerships. 88 households (34.9%) were made up of individuals, and 38 (15.1%) had someone living alone who was 65 years of age or older. The average household size was 2.01.  There were 131 families (52.0% of all households); the average family size was 2.47.

The population was spread out, with 51 people (10.0%) under the age of 18, 15 people (2.9%) aged 18 to 24, 96 people (18.9%) aged 25 to 44, 199 people (39.1%) aged 45 to 64, and 148 people (29.1%) who were 65 years of age or older.  The median age was 57.1 years. For every 100 females, there were 90.6 males.  For every 100 females age 18 and over, there were 90.8 males.

The homeowner vacancy rate was 4.0%; the rental vacancy rate was 7.4%.  345 people (67.8% of the population) lived in owner-occupied housing units and 162 people (31.8%) lived in rental housing units.

2000
As of the census of 2000, there were 317 people, 145 households, and 77 in the ZCTA 95420. The population density was 41/sq mi. There were 204 housing units, of which 20.3% were vacant, with 12.1% reserved for vacation/recreational use. The racial makeup of the ZCTA was 88% White, .6% Black or African American, .6% Native American, .6% Asian, 4.7% from other races, and 5.4% from two or more races. 3.5% of the population were Hispanic or Latino of any race.

There were 145 households, out of which 19.3% had children under the age of 18 living with them, 42% were married couples living together, 8.3% had a female householder with no husband present, and 46.9% were non-families. 37.2% of all households were made up of individuals, and 9.7% had someone living alone who was 65 years of age or older. The average household size was 2.14 and the average family size was 2.77.

In the ZCTA the population was spread out, with 17% under the age of 18, 3.5% from 18 to 24, 23.6% from 25 to 44, 39.7% from 45 to 64, and 16.2% who were 65 years of age or older. The median age was 47 years. 47.6% of the population was male, 52.4 female.

The median income for a household in the ZCTA was $37,813, and the median income for a family was $47,639. Males had a median income of $55,357 versus $27,841 for females. The per capita income for the ZCTA was $26,191. 22% of the population and 42.4% of families were below the poverty line. Out of the total population, 43.6% of those under the age of 18 were living below the poverty line.

Politics

Notable residents
Ronnie Gilbert, folk singer and activist
Jerry Juhl, television and film writer
Gene Parsons, musician, member of The Byrds

References

External links

Census-designated places in Mendocino County, California
Census-designated places in California
Populated coastal places in California
Populated places established in 1857
1857 establishments in California